The Sea and Sky Cygnet (also known as the Krucker Cygnet) is an American amphibious ultralight trike that was designed by J.P. Krucker and initially produced by his company Krucker Manufacturing in Sudbury, Ontario, Canada and later by Sea and Sky of Fort Walton Beach, Florida, United States. The aircraft is supplied as a kit for amateur construction or as a complete ready-to-fly-aircraft.

Design and development
The aircraft was designed to comply with the Fédération Aéronautique Internationale microlight category and the US light-sport aircraft rules. It features a strut-braced hang glider-style high-wing, weight-shift controls, a two-seats-in-tandem open cockpit, retractable wheeled tricycle landing gear and dual floats and a single engine in pusher configuration.

The aircraft is made from bolted-together aluminum tubing, with its single surface wing covered in Dacron sailcloth. Its  span wing is supported by struts and uses an "A" frame weight-shift control bar. The standard powerplants are the twin cylinder, liquid-cooled, two-stroke, dual-ignition  Rotax 582 engine, the four cylinder, air and liquid-cooled, four-stroke, dual-ignition  Rotax 912UL and the  Rotax 912ULS engines.

A number of different wings can be fitted to the basic carriage, including the North Wings Pulse  and  sizes.

Operational history
The Cygnet was awarded Best Trike at Sun 'n Fun in 2005.

Variants
Cygnet
Initial model
Cygnet 2
Improved model

Specifications (Cygnet 2 with North Wings Pulse 17 wing)

References

External links

Official video

2000s United States sport aircraft
2000s United States ultralight aircraft
Single-engined pusher aircraft
Ultralight trikes
Homebuilt aircraft